Ichthyapus insularis is an eel in the family Ophichthidae ("snake eels"). It was described by John E. McCosker in 2004. It is a tropical saltwater eel found only around Ascension Island in the southeastern Atlantic Ocean.

The species epithet "insularis", meaning "island" in Latin, refers to Ascension Island, to which I. insularis seems to be endemic.

References

Ophichthidae
Fish described in 2004